Pignolo (plural pignoli) are a type of cookie from Sicilian cuisine. Considered a standard of Italian confectionery, they are a common item at Italian bakeries. It is a popular cookie in all of southern Italy, and in Sicilian communities in the United States.

The cookie is a light golden color and studded with golden pine nuts (also called pignoli). Made with almond paste and egg whites, the cookie is moist, soft and chewy beneath the pine nuts.

Often they are formed into crescents; otherwise the cookies are round. Pignoli are a popular Italian holiday treat, especially at Christmas. Because both almond paste and pine nuts are relatively expensive, and this cookie uses substantial amounts of both, this cookie is a luxury food.

Being essentially an almond macaroon, this cookie belongs to a type known as "amaretto".

See also
Amaretto (disambiguation)
Panellets

References

External links

Almond cookies
Christmas food
Cookies
Italian pastries
Cuisine of Sicily